Eremnophila aureonotata, also known as the gold-marked thread-waisted wasp, is a species in the family Sphecidae ("thread-waisted wasps"), in the order Hymenoptera ("ants, bees, wasps and sawflies").

References

Further reading
 Arnett, Ross H. (2000). American Insects: A Handbook of the Insects of America North of Mexico. CRC Press.

External links
NCBI Taxonomy Browser, Eremnophila aureonotata

Sphecidae